Gayla Leigh Shoemake (born c. 1941) is a pageant titleholder from El Dorado, Kansas who competed in the Miss America pageant in 1960.

Biography
In June 1960 Shoemake competed for the Miss Kansas title, performing a dramatic reading as her talent. She was crowned Miss Kansas 1960 on 10 June by Governor George Docking and won a $1000 scholarship, jewellery and evening gowns.  In September the same year Shoemake represented Kansas in the Miss America 1961 pageant held in Atlantic City, New Jersey but did not place.

Shoemake attended Kansas State University where she was a cheerleader and member of the student council.  She was also a member of the Delta Delta Delta sorority and won the Miss Kansas State University pageant in 1959.

References

* Souvenir Program—14th Annual Football Festival, Berkeley, California - Junior Chamber of Commerce: 1959.

Miss America 1960s delegates
Kansas State University alumni
Year of birth missing (living people)
Living people
People from El Dorado, Kansas
20th-century American people